Tae-joon is a Korean male given name.

People with this name include:
Choi Tae-joon (born 1991), South Korean actor
Park Tae-joon (1927–2011), South Korean general and businessman
Ryu Tae-joon (born 1971), South Korean actor and singer

See also
List of Korean given names

Korean masculine given names